The BET Award for Best Movie is given to the overall best film released in the same or previous year. The award was first given in 2010.

Winners and nominees
Winners are listed first and highlighted in bold.

2010s

2020s

See also
 BET Award for Best Actor
 BET Award for Best Actress

References

BET Awards
African-American cinema